Festuca viridula is a species of grass known by several common names, including green fescue, greenleaf fescue, and mountain bunchgrass. It is native to western North America from British Columbia to Colorado, where it is most abundant in high-elevation forests and meadows.

Description
This fescue is a clumping perennial bunchgrass with stems generally one half to one meter in height. The leaves are narrow and often have rolled edges, are surrounded by sheaths that shred into fibers, and may be tough and spikelike on the lower part of the plant. The erect inflorescence has a few branches each holding flat green spikelets. This is an important forage grass for livestock in some areas.

External links

Jepson Manual Treatment: Festuca viridula
USDA Plants Profile 
Grass Manual Treatment
Festuca viridula - U.C. Photo gallery

viridula
Bunchgrasses of North America
Native grasses of California
Grasses of the United States
Grasses of Canada
Flora of British Columbia
Flora of Idaho
Flora of Colorado
Flora of the Sierra Nevada (United States)
Flora of North America
Flora without expected TNC conservation status